In late 2007, the Australian Rugby League and National Rugby League commissioned a college of 130 experts to select the 100 best rugby league players in the game's 100-year history in Australia. The list was released in February 2008.

From this list a "Team of the Century" was selected  – a team of 17 Australian players considered to be the best of all time in each position (plus four interchange/reserves and a coach). This illustrious line-up was announced in Sydney on 17 April 2008.

See also
Australian rugby league's 100 greatest players
List of Australia national rugby league team players

References

Rugby league in Australia
Team of the Century
Team of the Century